Palmadusta artuffeli is a species of sea snail, a cowry, a marine gastropod mollusk in the family Cypraeidae, the cowries.

Description

Distribution

References

 Jousseaume, F., 1876. Notes sur quelques Cypraea et description d'une espèce nouvelle. Bulletin de la Société Zoologique de France 1: 77-82

Cypraeidae
Gastropods described in 1876